The title of Honorary Citizen of Bucharest is the highest civic distinction, which rewards the talent and the special contributions of a person, Romanian or foreign, granted by the General Council of Bucharest. The title is granted, as the case may be, at the initiative of the Mayor General or the members of the General Council of Bucharest. The first person rewarded with this distinction was soprano Mariana Nicolesco in 1991.

References 

 Hon
Lists of Romanian people
Bucharest
Bucharest-related lists
Honorary citizens of Bucharest